This is a list of artists who have reached number one on the UK Singles Chart as recorded by the Official Charts Company since November 1952.

Artists are listed alphabetically.
Solo artists are listed by surname and groups are listed by full names excluding "the" or any foreign translations of "the".
Artists are credited separately if more than one artist is credited on a song (e.g. John Travolta and Olivia Newton-John each get separate credits for their duets from Grease). 
Artists who performed on a song but are not credited individually are not included, although notable cases may be recorded in the Notes column. Featured artists are listed if they are specifically credited on the single's cover. 
Artists who appear as part of a group who reached number one are not individually mentioned unless they have scored a solo number one (e.g. Paul McCartney's number one singles with The Beatles and Wings are not counted as his own, only those credited to himself are counted).

0–9

A

B

Back to top

C

Back to top

D

Back to top

E

Back to top

F

Back to top

G

Back to top

H

Back to top

I

Back to top

J

Back to top

K

Back to top

L

Back to top

M

Back to top

N

Back to top

O

Back to top

P

Back to top

Q

Back to top

R

Back to top

S

Back to top

T

Back to top

U

Back to top

V

Back to top

W

Back to top

X

Back to top

Y

Back to top

Z

Back to top

See also

 List of artists who reached number one on the UK Singles Downloads Chart

References 

UK singles chart, number one artists
Artists who reached number one